Blanca María Manchón Domínguez (born 6 March 1987 in Seville) is a Spanish windsurfer. She won the gold medal at the 2010 RS:X Windsurfing World Championships.

After Blanca announced her pregnancy on 2016, her main sponsor dropped her. Seven months after giving birth, Blanca was proclaimed Champion of the Windsurfing World in the Raceboard Class! This courageous woman sailed onwards with the support of her family and friends and most importantly, her son Noah.

In an interview with the Spanish newspaper Marca, Blanca criticised "the concept held that a sporting woman who becomes pregnant at age 29 is never again going to do anything, as if her career were finished.”

Blanca came back to competition. On one of her last tweets, she says: "8th in the World Cup The Chinese take the medals but I take that if you want YOU CAN! Super happy!!"

Notes

References

External links 
 
 
 
 

1987 births
Living people
Spanish female sailors (sport)
Spanish windsurfers
Female windsurfers
ISAF World Sailor of the Year (female)
Olympic sailors of Spain
Sailors at the 2004 Summer Olympics – Mistral One Design
Mediterranean Games medalists in sailing
Mediterranean Games gold medalists for Spain
Competitors at the 2018 Mediterranean Games
Sailors at the 2020 Summer Olympics – RS:X
RS:X class world champions